Conophytum jucundum is a species of succulent plants belonging to the family Aizoaceae. As its synonym Conophytum gratum, the pleasing cone plant, it has gained the Royal Horticultural Society's Award of Garden Merit.

Etymology
The genus name is derived from the Latin "conus" (cone) and Greek "phyto" (plant), while the species Latin name jucundum means pleasant, jocund.

Description
Conophytum jucundum are dwarf plants with small succulent evergreen leaves, forming in their development  small colonies.

Distribution and habitat
This species grows in South Africa at an altitude of 700 to 1100 m.

Synonyms
Conophytum jucundum subsp. jucundum
Mesembryanthemum jucundum N.E.Br. (1920)
Conophytum admiraalii L.Bolus (1965)
Conophytum geyeri L.Bolus (1963)
Conophytum gratum (N.E.Br.) N.E.Br.
Mesembryanthemum gratum N.E.Br. (1920)
Conophytum jacobsenianum  (1956)
Conophytum longistylum N.E.Br. (1930)
Conophytum maximum Tischer (1957)
Conophytum orbicum N.E.Br. ex Tischer (1955)
Conophytum praegratum Tischer (1954)
Conophytum rarum N.E.Br. (1933)
Conophytum robustum Tischer

References

 Biolib
 The plant list
 African Plant Database

Bibliography
II.Handbook succulent plants: Aizoaceae A-E : 150-151 (2001).
 Gibbs Russell, G. E., W. G. Welman, E. Reitief, K. L. Immelman, G. Germishuizen, B. J. Pienaar, M. v. Wyk & A. Nicholas. 1987. List of species of southern African plants. Mem. Bot. Surv. S. Africa 2(1–2): 1–152(pt. 1), 1–270(pt. 2).

jucundum
Endemic flora of South Africa
Flora of the Cape Provinces
Taxa named by N. E. Brown